Kim Jin-young (born February 13, 2003) is a South Korean actress. She appeared in films such as Sleeping, The Fault Is Not Yours, Family Affair and Girl Malsuk. She is best known for her role as Kim Ji-min in the 2022 South Korean television series, All of Us Are Dead.

Biography and career 
Kim Jin-young was born on February 12, 2003, in South Korea. She attended Korea National University of Arts. In 2016 she made her debut as an actress in film Sleeping and she joined Snowball Entertainment. After her debut she appeared in film Family Affair as Gyu-rim with Jang Hye-ji and Lee Sang-hee the movie was premiered at 24th Busan International Film Festival and her performance was praised. The same year she appeared in film The Fault Is Not Yours as Hyun-jung with Yoon Chan-young, Son Sang-yeon and Kim Min-ju the film was premiered at Jeonju International Film Festival. In 2020 she appeared in music video opposite with Son Sang-yeon That's It by Hoppipolla her performance was praised by portraying the role of a student. In 2022 she became known for role in Netflix series All of Us Are Dead as Kim Ji-min.

Filmography

Television series

Film

Music video appearances

References

External links 
 

2003 births
Living people
21st-century South Korean actresses
South Korean television actresses
South Korean film actresses